Aljaž Bedene was the two-time defending champion but chose not to participate.

Miljan Zekić won the title after defeating Stefano Napolitano 6–7(6–8), 6–4, 6–3 in the final.

Seeds

Draw

Finals

Top half

Bottom half

References
Main Draw
Qualifying Draw

Internazionali di Tennis dell'Umbria - Singles
2016 Singles